Bormino may refer to:
Bormino (cheese), Italian cheese
Bormino (village), a village in Tver Oblast, Russia